The 1986 NCAA Women's Gymnastics championship involved 10 schools competing for the national championship of women's NCAA Division I gymnastics.  It was the fifth NCAA gymnastics national championship and the defending NCAA Team Champion for 1985 was Utah.  The Competition took place in Gainesville, Florida hosted by the University of Florida in the O'Connell Center.  The 1986 Championship marked the first time that a record score was not set.

Team Results

Top Ten Individual All-Around Results

Individual Event Finals Results

Vault

Uneven Bars

Balance Beam

Floor Exercise

External links
  Gym Results

NCAA Women's Gymnastics championship
NCAA Women's Gymnastics Championship